Groove Coverage is a German dance band which consists of Axel Konrad, DJ Novus, Melanie Munch, better known as Mell (lead singer), and Verena Rehm (former stage performer, backing singer, occasional lead singer). Producers of the band are Ole Wierk and Axel Konrad. The project was founded in the summer of 2001 by DJ Novus, in co-operation with Suprime Music (Konrad). With eleven singles in the German Top 50 and over 13 million records sold worldwide, Groove Coverage is one of the most successful German dance artists.

History

Covergirl (2001–2002)
Groove Coverage released a few dance singles, most notably "Are U Ready" and "Hit Me" before going on to release the breakthrough single "Moonlight Shadow" (a cover of the Mike Oldfield song) peaking at #3 in the German media control charts in June 2002. At the end of 2002, the band released their debut album Covergirl, with the follow up single "God is a Girl". Mell was pregnant during the production of the Moonlight Shadow music clip, which was filmed in Budapest, and was replaced by model Henrika Spillner.

7 Years and 50 Days and international breakthrough (2003–2004)
After the success of the singles "Moonlight Shadow" and "God Is A Girl", Groove Coverage went on to release a new single titled "The End", which was released in April 2003, peaking at #14 in the German Media Control Charts. In late 2003 came the next top 10 hit single, a cover of Alice Cooper's hit "Poison", followed by the second studio album 7 Years and 50 Days in March 2004, which spawned out five top 20 singles in Germany: "The End", "Poison", "7 Years and 50 Days", "She" and "Runaway".

21st Century and Greatest Hits (2005–2007)
In 2005, 7 Years and 50 Days reached platinum sales in Asia, as well as being hugely successful in Indonesia. In the UK and Ireland, the band's cover of "Poison" became a top 40 hit, peaking at #32 in the Official UK Singles Chart which helped the band reach to new territories such as Spain and China, where "God Is a Girl" became the most successful song of 2007, having been downloaded more than 1.5 million times.

In July 2006, the band released their third studio album 21st Century, which included their recent singles "Holy Virgin", "On the Radio" and "21st Century Digital Girl".

With only moderate success with their third album, Groove Coverage did not release any more music until late 2007, where they released the single "Because I Love You" to promote their first Greatest Hits compilation. Again the band only experienced moderate success with the new single and album, and were dropped by their label Universal Music Germany.

Riot on the Dancefloor (2010–2012)
In 2010, Groove Coverage celebrated their new music contract with Sony Music / Columbia. For this, they released the highly anticipated new single "Innocent", another Mike Oldfield cover. The single became the highest new entry in the German Media Control Charts, peaking at #38.

In Spring 2011, the single "Angeline" was released, peaking at #22 in the German Media Control Charts; the single proved to be a massive success for the band, staying in the German top 50 Charts for over 16 weeks, as well as peaking at #1 in both the DJ Top 100 International charts, and the MusicLoad digital charts.

In March 2012, the highly anticipated fourth studio album Riot On The Dancefloor was released.

"Tell Me", "Wait", and "Million Tears" (2013–2016)
On 1 December 2013, the band launched their new website, where they announced that they had finished work on the new single and that it would be out soon. "Tell Me" was released on 31 January 2014. The music video premiered a few days before its release  and features many guest appearances including Rameez, DJane HouseKat, Verena Rehm, Micaela Schaefer and Shaun Baker.

On 19 December 2014, Groove Coverage surprised fans with the release of their single "Wait". A music video for the release was published on 17 December 2014.

On 29 May 2015, the band is planning to release their eighteenth single, "Million Tears". The track was originally featured on their 2002 album Covergirl, but it was never released as a single for it. The single version has been re-recorded with a new production.

New single "Wake Up" (2017)
On 1 June the group changed their Facebook picture with the message "Our next single is ready, and now we're looking for fresh re-mixers." Seeking re-mixers or producers caring to try their own version of the track 110 to 130 bpm in any kind
of genre. No title or release date was given yet. fans expected release fall of 2017.

The group wrote on their official Facebook-page that the new single would be out in autumn and they premiered their video for "Wake Up" on their facebook-page 11/16/17 .

"Wake Up" includes a vocal loop, inspired/resembling a similar melody and lyrics of Spice Girls 1998 song "Viva Forever". Covers are a common theme often found in their production, in respect to the band's name Groove Coverage. Some of their songs, not all, are exact or partial covers re-created in the electronic dance style. The instrumental of "Wake Up" is reminiscent of their own classic aesthetics. The song runs at 128 BPM, layered in synths, melancholic melodies, and topped with 4 on the floor drumbeats. Production of this track is similar to "God Is A Girl" (a song Groove Coverage released 15 years prior) "Moonlight Shadow" and "The End" as well as the majority of their discography.

20th anniversary (2021–2022)

In anticipation for the 20th anniversary, Groove Coverage released two new singles in November 2021: “Higher Energy” and a re-release of “Moonlight Shadow” in collaboration with W&W. 

On 31 January 2022, the band posted new press pics for their 20th anniversary. A third single “Monsters In My Head” was released on 11 February 2022. Mell shared a teaser clip on her Instagram account the week before its release.

On 1 April 2022, the band began their 20th anniversary world tour. A teaser for the next single “The Truth” was posted on 11 April 2022. The single was set for release on 15 April 2022.

Discography

Albums

Compilations
 Best of Groove Coverage (CD + DVD) (2005)
 Best of Groove Coverage: The Ultimate Collection (3 CD) (2005) (Hong Kong)
 Greatest Hits (2006) (U.S.)
 Greatest Hits (2 CD) (2007)
 Poison (The Best Of Groove Coverage) (Rare Japan CD)
 The Definitive Greatest Hits & Videos (Singapore) (2008)
Tour 2019

Singles

Remixes
Chupa - "Arriba" (2001)
DJ Valium - "Bring the Beat Back" (2002)
X-Perience - "It's a Sin" (2002)
Special D - "Come with Me" (2002)
Silicon Bros - "Million Miles from Home" (2002)
Seven - "Spaceman Came Traveling" (2003)
DJ Cosmo - "Lovesong" (2003)
Sylver - "Livin' My Life" (2003)
Alice Cooper - "Poison" (2003)
Mandaryna - "Here I Go Again" (2004)
Sylver - "Love Is an Angel" (2004)
Baracuda - "Ass Up!" (2005)
Melanie Flash - "Halfway to Heaven" (2006)
N-Euro - "Lover on the Line" (2006)
Max Deejay vs. DJ Miko - "What's Up" (2006)
Baracuda - "La Di Da" (2007)
DJ Goldfinger - "Love Journey Deluxe" (2008)
Arnie B - "Another Story" (2008)
Arsenium - "Rumadai" (2008)
Master Blaster - "Everywhere" (2008)
N.I.N.A - "No More Tears" (2008)
Ayumi Hamasaki - "Vogue" (2011)
Kim Wilde - "It's alright" (2011)
Within Temptation - "Sinéad" (2011)
DJane Housekat feat. Rameez - "My Party" (2012)

Members
Axel Konrad (producer)
Ole Wierk  (producer)
DJ Novus – DJ (1999–present)
Melanie Munch (Mell) – lead singer (2002–present)
Verena Rehm – backup singer (2002–present)

References

External links
Official website 

 
1999 establishments in Germany
German dance music groups
German Eurodance groups
German trance music groups
Musical groups established in 1999